Kuznetsovo is the name of several rural localities in Russia:
Kuznetsovo, Amur Oblast, a selo in Kuznetsovsky Selsoviet of Magdagachinsky District, Kostroma Oblast
Kuznetsovo, Chukhlomsky District, Kostroma Oblast, a village in Nozhkinskoye Rural Settlement of Chukhlomsky District, Kostroma Oblast